Luis Ignacio Sotomayor Orrego (born 4 December 1996) is a Chilean footballer that currently plays for Deportes Iquique.

Club career
In his debut season, he played five 2014–15 Copa Chile games and was part of the 2013–14 team which won that tournament.

Honours

Club
Deportes Iquique
 Copa Chile: 2013–14

References

1996 births
Living people
Chilean footballers
Chilean Primera División players
Segunda División Profesional de Chile players
Independiente de Cauquenes footballers
Deportes Iquique footballers
Association football goalkeepers
People from Iquique